The Japanese manga series Saint Seiya: The Lost Canvas – Myth of Hades is written and illustrated by Shiori Teshirogi. It is based on the manga Saint Seiya, which was created, written and illustrated by Japanese author Masami Kurumada. The manga tells the story of the previous Holy War, taking place in the 18th century, 250 years before the original series, in the Saint Seiya universe. The Lost Canvas focuses on how an orphan named Tenma becomes one of Athena's 88 warriors known as Saints and finds himself in a war fighting against his best friend Alone who is revealed to be the reincarnation of Athena's biggest enemy, the god of the underworld Hades.

It was published by Akita Shoten in the Weekly Shōnen Champion magazine from August 24, 2006 until April 7, 2011 and was collected in twenty-five tankōbon. The first volume was published on December 12, 2006 and the twenty-fifth and final on May 6, 2011. A short story comprised in 40 pages, or gaiden, titled  was published on October 16, 2009, in the issues 11 and 12 of Akita Shōten's Princess Gold magazine. TMS Entertainment also produced a series of twenty-six original video animations based on the manga between June 24, 2009 and July 11, 2011.

Additionally, the serialization of a new series of short stories titled , focusing on the Gold Saints of the 18th century presented in The Lost Canvas, has started, with the first chapter published on May 19, 2011. Its first volume was released in Japan on October 7, 2011. As of April 23, 2012, it was announced in the Shōnen Champion magazine that The Lost Canvas would cease being published weekly, becoming a monthly comic starting in June, and shifting publishing to the newly created magazine, Akita's Bessatsu Shōnen Champion, resuming publishing of the remaining Anecdotes chapters in that month.

Volume list

Anecdotes chapters

Sidestory

Chapters not yet in tankōbon format
 11. , published on January 19, 2022.

 12. , published on February 19, 2022.

 13. , published on March 19, 2022.

References

Chapters (Saint Seiya Lost Canvas)